The 1989–1990 international cricket season was from September 1989 to April 1990.

Season overview

October

1989-90 Champions Trophy

1989 MRF World Series

November

India in Pakistan

New Zealand in Australia

December

Sri Lanka in Australia

1989–90 Benson & Hedges World Series

January

Pakistan in Australia

February

India in New Zealand

England in the West Indies

March

1990 Rothmans Cup Triangular Series

Australia in New Zealand

References

1989 in cricket
1990 in cricket